Henhull is a civil parish in Cheshire East, England.  It contains four buildings that are recorded in the National Heritage List for England as designated listed buildings, all of which are at Grade II.  This grade is the lowest of the three gradings given to listed buildings and is applied to "buildings of national importance and special interest".  The parish contains no major settlements, and is almost entirely rural.  The Shropshire Union Canal passes through the parish.  All the listed buildings are close to the entrance of its Nantwich Basin, and consist of a bridge, a lock gate, a milepost, and a cottage.

See also

Listed buildings in Acton
Listed buildings in Hurleston
Listed buildings in Nantwich
Listed buildings in Worleston

References
Citations

Sources

 

Listed buildings in the Borough of Cheshire East
Lists of listed buildings in Cheshire